Charlie King (born 31 July 1926) is a former  Australian rules footballer who played with Geelong in the Victorian Football League (VFL).

Notes

External links 

Living people
1926 births
Australian rules footballers from Victoria (Australia)
Geelong Football Club players
Sandhurst Football Club players